Domingos Lam Ka Tseung  (9 April 1928 – 27 July 2009)  was the first Chinese-born bishop in the Roman Catholic Diocese of Macau. On 26 May 1987, he was appointed Coadjutor Bishop of Macau and succeeded Arquimínio Rodrigues da Costa, the last Portuguese bishop, on 6 October 1988. He resigned on 30 June 2003, and died aged 81 in 2009

References

1928 births
2009 deaths
20th-century Roman Catholic bishops in Macau
21st-century Roman Catholic bishops in Macau
Hong Kong Roman Catholics